Big Injun Lake is a natural lake in Menominee County, Wisconsin, in the United States.

Although there are dozens of place names in Wisconsin containing the word "Indian", Big Injun Lake is the only place in the state using the variant Injun.

See also
List of lakes in Wisconsin

References

Lakes of Menominee County, Wisconsin